Seniority in both houses of the United States Congress is valuable as it confers a number of benefits and is based on length of continuous service, with ties broken by a series of factors. The following lists the most senior women in either or both houses of Congress, sometimes called the "dean of women" in either chamber.

Synopsis
In the House, Edith Nourse Rogers, who served 35 years from 1925 to 1960 as one of the first women elected to Congress (and the first woman elected from Massachusetts), was the longest-serving female Representative upon her death in office in 1960. Her record was surpassed in 2018 by Marcy Kaptur of Ohio, who has served in the House since 1983. 

In the Senate, Margaret Chase Smith, who served for 23 years from 1949 to 1973 as a senator from Maine, was the longest-serving female Senator upon her retirement. Her record was surpassed in 2011 by Barbara Mikulski of Maryland, who served for 30 years from 1987 to 2017.

Across both houses of Congress, Rogers' 35 years of service from 1925 to 1960 was the longest for a female member when she died in office in 1960. Her record was surpassed in 2012 by Mikulski, who served a total of 40 years in Congress from 1977 to 2017 (10 years in the House of Representatives and 30 years in the Senate).

 Maxine Waters and Eleanor Holmes Norton, both inaugurated in 1991, are the longest-serving African-American women (and women of color) in the House.
 Patsy Mink, who was the dean of women in the House from 1997 to 2002, was the longest-serving Asian-American woman in the House (and Congress).
 Carol Moseley-Braun is the longest-serving (and first) African-American woman (and woman of color) in the Senate.
 Ileana Ros-Lehtinen is the longest-serving Hispanic or Latina American woman in the House.
 Edith Nourse Rogers is the longest-serving Republican woman in the House.
 Catherine Cortez Masto is the longest-serving Hispanic or Latina American woman in the Senate.
 Tammy Baldwin is the longest-serving LGBT woman in both the House and Senate.
 Nita Lowey is the longest-serving Jewish-American woman in the House.
 Dianne Feinstein is the longest-serving (and first) Jewish-American woman in the Senate.
 Ilhan Omar and Rashida Tlaib, both inaugurated in 2019, are the first and longest-serving Muslim women in the House (and in Congress).

Women of the House of Representatives

Women of the Senate

Most senior by party

House

Republican
 Jeannette Rankin
 Alice Mary Robertson
 Mae Nolan
 Florence Kahn
 Edith Nourse Rogers
 Frances P. Bolton
 Florence P. Dwyer
 Margaret Heckler
 Marjorie Holt
 Virginia D. Smith
 Olympia Snowe
 Marge Roukema
 Nancy Johnson
 Ileana Ros-Lehtinen
 Kay Granger (incumbent)

Democratic
 Mary Teresa Norton
 Reva Bosone
 Edna F. Kelly
 Leonor Sullivan
 Shirley Chisholm
 Patricia Schroeder
 Patsy Mink
 Marcy Kaptur (incumbent)

Senate

Republican
 Gladys Pyle
 Vera C. Bushfield
 Margaret Chase Smith
 Nancy Kassebaum
 Kay Hutchison
 Susan Collins (incumbent)

Democratic
 Rebecca Latimer Felton
 Hattie Wyatt Caraway
 Maurine Neuberger
 Elaine Edwards
 Muriel Humphrey Brown
 Barbara Mikulski
 Dianne Feinstein (incumbent)

See also
 Mother of the House

References

Congress
Lists of women legislators
Female members of the United States Congress